Takahisa Oguchi (小口貴久 born January 11, 1979) is a Japanese luger who has competed since 1999. He finished 20th in the men's singles event at the 2006 Winter Olympics in Turin. At the previous Winter Olympics in Salt Lake City, Oguchi competed in the men's doubles event, but did not finish.

Oguchi's best finish at the FIL World Luge Championships was 16th in the men's singles event at Lake Placid, New York in 2009.

He later went into graduate research in biomechanics at Shinshu University in Nagano, Japan.

Oguchi qualified for the 2010 Winter Olympics where he finished 30th in the men's singles event.

References
 
 
 Takahisa OGUCHI profile at The-Sports.org
 YUKI 2004 symposium in Nagano, Japan featuring Oguchi
 2002 luge men's doubles results
 2006 luge men's singles results

External links
 

1979 births
Living people
Japanese male lugers
Olympic lugers of Japan
Lugers at the 2002 Winter Olympics
Lugers at the 2006 Winter Olympics
Lugers at the 2010 Winter Olympics